Räbi is a village in Otepää Parish, Valga County in southeastern Estonia. Räbi has a population of 58 (as of 1 January 2011).

Räbi Lake and Päidla Väikejärv are located in the village.

Räbi Lake

References

Villages in Valga County